A chief minister in Pakistan is the elected head of government of one of Pakistan's four provinces or the two non-provincial sub-national territories that have assemblies. The chief minister is elected through elections and the majority party is invited to elect a leader, whose tenure lasts for five years.

Current chief ministers in Pakistan 
The table below lists the currently serving chief ministers and heads of administrative units (AUs) of Pakistan as of January 2023.

Current prime minister of Azad Jammu Kashmir

See also 
 List of prime ministers of Pakistan
 Chief Secretary (Pakistan)

 List of current Pakistani governors

References 

Chief Minister
 Chief Minister
Governors